Faster is a 2003 documentary film about the motorcycle road racing world championship, MotoGP. Filmed between 2001 and 2002 by director Mark Neale, it features cinematography by music video director Grant Gee and is narrated by Ewan McGregor. It was succeeded by a 2-disc "Ultimate Collector's Edition" re-release in 2004 which included "Faster '03-'04 The Sequel". In 2006, The Doctor, The Tornado and The Kentucky Kid (or DTK) was released, followed by "Fastest" in 2011 and "Hitting the Apex" in 2015.

Overview
The film spotlights the MotoGP world championship, the premiere level of motorcycle road racing, which is a series of sixteen races on five continents contested by twenty-four riders. The film includes appearances by Valentino Rossi, Max Biaggi, Australian veteran Garry McCoy and young American John Hopkins. Several former world champions are interviewed, including Mick Doohan, Kevin Schwantz, paralyzed former racer Wayne Rainey, Kenny Roberts and Barry Sheene.

The film depicts the bitter rivalry between Max Biaggi and Valentino Rossi. Their personality clash is captured in television interviews and they lock horns both on and off the track.

Sections of the film feature Dr. Claudio Costa, a physician who follows the riders from track to track. Costa lends his unique style to mending broken bones and advising riders on their suitability to put their broken bodies back out on the track.

Garry McCoy's unique style is portrayed. McCoy somehow manages to spin up his rear tire while braking into corners. Despite breaking the "rules of riding" McCoy manages to nab fastest lap times and win races with his impossible style.

The film was produced by Los Angeles-based Spark Productions in association with Dorna Sports SL, the rights-holder for MotoGP, and shot around the world between 2001 and 2002. It was executive produced by Neale, Ian MacLean and Chris Paine.

The film premiered at Cannes in 2003.

Notable appearances
 Max Biaggi
 Loris Capirossi
 Carlos Checa
 Mick Doohan
 Colin Edwards
 Noriyuki Haga
 Nicky Hayden
 John Hopkins
 Eddie Lawson
 Randy Mamola
 Garry McCoy
 Shinya Nakano
 Kenny Roberts
 Wayne Rainey
 Valentino Rossi
 Kevin Schwantz
 Barry Sheene

DVD
The film was released as a 2-disc DVD on November 16, 2004. In addition to the movie, extras include on-board camera footage from actual races, and a short sequel film called "Faster & Faster" on events after 2003 and the early stages of the 2004 season which mainly focused on Valentino Rossi's transition from Honda to Yamaha.

References

External links
 Faster at the Official Movie Site
 
 

2003 films
American auto racing films
American sports documentary films
Documentary films about auto racing
Motorcycle racing films
Films set in 2001
Films set in 2002
Films scored by Tomandandy
2000s English-language films
Films directed by Mark Neale
2000s American films
Grand Prix motorcycle racing